National Highway 465, commonly referred to as NH 465 is a national highway in India. It is a secondary route of primary National Highway 65.  NH-465 runs in the state of Maharashtra in India.

Route 
NH465 connects Mohol, Kurul, Mandrup, Basavanagar, Walsang and Tandulwadi in the state of Maharashtra.

Junctions  
 
  Terminal near Mohol.
  near Kamti
  near Mandrup
  near Valsang
  Terminal near Tandulwadi.

See also 
 List of National Highways in India
 List of National Highways in India by state

References

External links 

 NH 465 on OpenStreetMap

National highways in India
National Highways in Maharashtra